William Eldred Berntsen (25 March 1912 – 14 September 1994) was a Danish competitive sailor and Olympic medalist. He won a silver medal in the 5.5 Metre class at the 1960 Summer Olympics in Rome, together with Søren Hancke and Steen Christensen.

References

External links
 
 
 

1912 births
1994 deaths
Danish male sailors (sport)
Olympic sailors of Denmark
Olympic silver medalists for Denmark
Olympic medalists in sailing
Sailors at the 1948 Summer Olympics – Dragon
Sailors at the 1952 Summer Olympics – Dragon
Sailors at the 1960 Summer Olympics – 5.5 Metre
Sailors at the 1964 Summer Olympics – 5.5 Metre
Sailors at the 1968 Summer Olympics – 5.5 Metre
Medalists at the 1960 Summer Olympics